Ischnotoma is a genus of true crane fly.

Species
Subgenus Icriomastax Enderlein, 1912
I. antinympha (Alexander, 1942)
I. calliope (Alexander, 1945)
I. euterpe (Alexander, 1945)
I. helios (Alexander, 1949)
I. jujuyensis (Alexander, 1920)
I. nitra (Alexander, 1945)
I. nudicornis (Macquart, 1838)
I. ocellata (Enderlein, 1912)
I. phaeton (Alexander, 1945)
I. zikani (Alexander, 1936)
Subgenus Ischnotoma Skuse, 1890
I. concinna (Philippi, 1866)
I. decorata (Philippi, 1866)
I. delpontei (Alexander, 1929)
I. eburnea (Walker, 1848)
I. episema Alexander, 1924
I. fagetorum (Alexander, 1929)
I. fastidiosa (Skuse, 1890)
I. frauenfeldi (Schiner, 1868)
I. fuscobasalis Alexander, 1937
I. fuscostigmosa (Alexander, 1929)
I. goldfinchi Alexander, 1924
I. homochroa (Alexander, 1926)
I. immaculipennis Alexander, 1924
I. larotypa (Alexander, 1929)
I. par (Walker, 1856)
I. penai (Alexander, 1952)
I. peracuta Alexander, 1971
I. porteri (Alexander, 1929)
I. postnotalis (Alexander, 1929)
I. prionoceroides Alexander, 1922
I. problematica (Alexander, 1945)
I. rubriventris (Macquart, 1846)
I. rubroabdominalis Alexander, 1922
I. rufistigmosa (Macquart, 1838)
I. rufiventris (Macquart, 1846)
I. schineriana (Alexander, 1928)
I. scutellumnigrum Alexander, 1924
I. shannoniana (Alexander, 1929)
I. silvai (Alexander, 1929)
I. skuseana Alexander, 1928
I. tarwinensis Alexander, 1928
I. terminata Alexander, 1928
I. vittigera (Philippi, 1866)
Subgenus Neotipula Alexander, 1940
I. maya (Alexander, 1912)
I. paprzyckii (Alexander, 1941)
I. pectinella (Alexander, 1940)
I. penata (Alexander, 1966)

References

Tipulidae